Smith Lake is a lake in Berrien County, in the U.S. state of Michigan.

Smith Lake has the name of John Smith, the original owner of the site.

References

Lakes of Berrien County, Michigan